Harris Associates L.P. is a Chicago-based investment company that manages $86 billion in assets as of September 30, 2022. Harris manages long-only U.S. equity, international equity, and global equity strategies which are offered through its mutual fund company, the Oakmark Funds, and other types of vehicles. Harris is wholly owned by Natixis Investment Managers, an American-French financial services firm that is principally owned by BPCE. Harris Associates retains full control of investment decisions, investment philosophy, and day-to-day operations.

History 
Harris Associates was founded in 1976 by Victor Morgenstern, Myron Szold, Roger Brown, Ralph Wanger, Joe Braucher, Peter Foreman, Ed Neisser and Earl Rusnak, who had previously worked in the private investment office of Chicago entrepreneur Irving Harris. Irving Harris was not directly related to the Norman Harris who established Harris Bank..

Investment philosophy 
Harris Associates is considered to be a value investor. The investment process entails investing in businesses that are trading at a discount to intrinsic value.  The intrinsic value is based on a discounted cash flow analysis that takes into account the quality of management and the company's ability to grow.   According to research by Morningstar in April 2013 which analyzed the performance of the seven Oakmark funds over a five-year period, four were ranked in at least the top 2% in their relevant categories.

Investment managers 
As of 2020, notable investment managers include Bill Nygren, who joined in 1983 is known for a value investing approach.

Supreme Court case 
In 2009, the U.S. Supreme Court agreed to hear Jones v. Harris Associates, a suit brought in federal court by a group of mutual fund investors against the firm.  The mutual fund investors, who are investors in the Oakmark funds, claimed that the funds have overpaid their advisor (Harris Associates), and that the fees that Harris Associates charges Oakmark investors are higher than the fees that Harris charges institutional clients.

The suit previously had been thrown out by the United States Court of Appeals for the Seventh Circuit in 2008, with a judge who is a noted free-market backer, Richard Posner arguing that sometimes marketplaces need to be reined in.

In March 2010, the Supreme Court unanimously vacated the Seventh Circuit's ruling and remanded the case.

Investments 
As of January 2023, Harris Associates reported a holding of below 3 per cent in the Credit Suisse Group.

References

External links 

Investment management companies of the United States
Companies based in Chicago
Financial services companies established in 1976
1976 establishments in Illinois